Fenwick Tower may refer to:

Fenwick Tower (Halifax, Nova Scotia), Canada
Fenwick Tower, Northumberland, Matfen, England